Knock-Knock Who? is Kimya Dawson's second solo album, released concurrently with My Cute Fiend Sweet Princess in 2004.

Track listing
 "Nobody's Hippie"
 "Great Crap"
 "My Bike"
 "Jest's Birthday"
 "Time to Think"
 "The Sound of Ataris"
 "So Nice So Smart"
 "For Boxer"
 "I'm Fine"
 "Stink Mama"
 "Red White & Blue Dream (Oops!)"
 "Once Upon a Time"

References 

Kimya Dawson albums
2004 albums
Important Records albums